Jayin (also Romanized as Jāyīn; also known as Jāīn) is a village in Ashkara Rural District, Fareghan District, Hajjiabad County, Hormozgan Province, Iran. At the 2006 census, its population was 1,572, in 380 families.

References 

Populated places in Hajjiabad County